Tenarunga or Tenania, previously Narunga and formerly Minto Island is a low, wooded and uninhabited atoll in the Acteon Group in the southeastern part of the Tuamotu Islands in French Polynesia. It is administratively a part of the Gambier Islands.

Geography
There are some buildings and a dock located on the north-east side of the island, indicating former and/or seasonal habitation.

The atoll's lagoon is not accessible from the sea.

History
The first recorded sighting of this atoll was made during the Spanish expedition of the Portuguese navigator Pedro Fernández de Quirós on 5 February 1606 under the name Las Cuatro Coronadas (the "four crowned" (by coconut palms)); however, these observations were not fully documented. As such, the first unambiguous approach to the island was made on 14 March 1828 by the collector Hugh Cuming in his ship The Discoverer, captained by Samuel Grimwood.  The next visit was in 1833 by the navigator Thomas Ebrill on his merchant's vessel Amphitrite and again in 1837 by Lord Edward Russell, commander of the H.M.S Actaeon, the name given to the group.

Flora and fauna
The island is home to many rare species including the Tuamotu sandpiper.

In 2015 a conservation campaign resulted in the eradication of rats from the island.

See also

 Matureivavao
 Tenararo
 Vahanga
 Acteon Group
 Desert island
 List of islands

References

Sailing Directions, Pub 126, "Pacific Islands" NIMA 2002; page-12

External links
Atoll list (in French)
Google Maps
Island Conservation: Acteon and Gambier Archipelagos Restoration Project

Atolls of the Tuamotus
Islands of the Gambier Islands
Uninhabited islands of French Polynesia
Island restoration